Sadcore is a subgenre occasionally identified by music journalists to describe examples of alternative rock characterised by bleak lyrics, downbeat melodies and slower tempos, or alternatively, songs with deceivingly upbeat melodies that are simultaneously characterised by depressive lyrical undertones or imagery. It is a loose definition and does not describe a specific movement, group or scene. It is categorised by AllMusic's reference guide as music "by and for the depressed". Sadcore is sometimes considered synonymous with the term slowcore, and both share the distinction of often being dismissed as a label by the bands they would describe.

LA Weekly called Charlyn Marshall (also called Cat Power) the "Queen of Sadcore". In 2006, The News Record used the term to refer to Arab Strap, describing their sound as "a lot like the band's native Scotland: dark, cold, rainy and depressing" as well as "aggressive and somber."

The term is still current in pop culture. Lana Del Rey's musical style has been described as "Hollywood sadcore". In regard to her song, "Blue Jeans", MTV journalist Nicole James noted the neologism is a "music buzz word" floating around the music blogosphere.

See also 

 Sad pop

References

Alternative rock genres
British rock music genres
British styles of music
American rock music genres
American styles of music